Salehak (also Romanized as Şāleḩak) is a village in Asiab Rural District, in the Central District of Omidiyeh County, Khuzestan Province, Iran. At the 2006 census, its population was 205, in 40 families.

References 

Populated places in Omidiyeh County